The 1868 Kirkcudbrightshire by-election was an uncontested election held on 30 January 1868.  The by-election was brought about due to the death of the incumbent Liberal MP, James Mackie.  It was won by the Liberal candidate Wellwood Herries Maxwell, who stood unopposed.

References

1868 in Scotland
1860s elections in Scotland
Kirkcudbrightshire
1868 elections in the United Kingdom
By-elections to the Parliament of the United Kingdom in Scottish constituencies
19th century in Scotland
January 1868 events